Ben Morris is a special effects artist. He was co-nominated for Academy Award for Best Visual Effects for Star Wars: The Last Jedi.

References

External links

Visual effects supervisors
Living people
Year of birth missing (living people)
Place of birth missing (living people)
Best Visual Effects Academy Award winners
BAFTA winners (people)
Primetime Emmy Award winners